Via Crucis, S.53, is a work for mixed choir, soloists and organ (also harmonium or piano) by Franz Liszt. The work is devoted to the Stations of the Cross. It is one of the last works of Liszt.

Liszt started the composition of this work in the fall of 1878 when he stayed in Rome and ended it in February 1879 in Budapest. There are three sources of the work available: the first sketches in Weimar, the manuscript of the whole work in Budapest and a copy of it in Weimar. The original version was set with accompaniment by organ. Liszt made later a version with piano.

The work is a special case in the oeuvre of Liszt, especially because it is a work of great serenity. The work is also special because it reaches the limits of tonality, breaking the status quo of predominant tonal music of the time. The work combines unison songs (Stations I and XIV) with Lutheran chorales (Stations IV and XII), and chorales inspired by Bach's chorales (Station VI), whereas other stations consist of solo organ (or piano). Liszt self wanted to perform the work in the Colosseum with accompaniment by a giant harmonium. However, he never saw the piece performed because the first performance only took place 43 years after the composer's death: it premiered in Budapest on Good Friday 29 March 1929, conducted by the composer Artúr Harmat, Professor of Church Music at the Liszt Academy.

Setting 
The work follows the fourteen stations:

Sources 
 Franz Liszt, Via Crucis. Die 14 Stationen des Kreuzwegs (1878/79), Ausgewählte Werke vokaler Kirchenmusik, Heft 3, by Thomas Kohlhase, Partitur mit Einleitung, Carus 40.173, s.a., s.l. (Tübingen, 1977).

External links

Compositions by Franz Liszt
Crucifixion of Jesus